Aditya Putra Dewa (born 11 June 1990) is an Indonesian professional footballer who plays as a left midfielder or left back for Liga 1 club Barito Putera, on loan from  Liga 2 club PSIM Yogyakarta.

International career 
He made his debut for Indonesia in 2014 FIFA World Cup qualification against Bahrain on 29 February 2012.

Honours

Club
PSS Sleman
 Liga 2: 2018

Individual
 Indonesia Super League U-21 Top Goalscorer: 2008-09 (10 goals)

References

External links 
 
 Aditya Putra Dewa at Liga Indonesia

1990 births
Living people
Indonesian footballers
Association football midfielders
Liga 1 (Indonesia) players
Liga 2 (Indonesia) players
PSM Makassar players
Persepam Madura Utama players
Madura United F.C. players
Dewa United F.C. players
PSS Sleman players
PSIM Yogyakarta players
Persikabo 1973 players
Indonesia international footballers
People from Simalungun Regency
Sportspeople from North Sumatra